Peter Pedersen may refer to:

Peter Pedersen (politician) (born 1954), Swedish politician
Peter Dorf Pedersen (1897–1967), Danish gymnast
Peter Pedersen (football manager), 2002–2003 Holbæk B&I manager

See also
Peter Peterson (disambiguation)
Peter Petersen (disambiguation)
Peder Pedersen (disambiguation)
Petter Pedersen (disambiguation)